Selma Giöbel (1843–1925) was a Swedish artist.  She was active as a textile designer (particularly for carpets and wall paper), sculptor and engraver, and regarded as one of the most notable Swedish textile designers of the late 19th-century.  She was a member of the Friends of Handicraft and co-founded the art firm Svensk Konstslöjdsutställning ("Swedish Art- and Handicrafts Exhibition") with Berta Hübner and was its managing director in 1885–1898.  She successfully participated in several international art exhibitions.

Giöbel was a member of the women's association Nya Idun and one of its first committee members. She was awarded the Illis quorum in 1898.

References

Further reading 
 
 * "Selma Giöbel – 70 år" in Dagny, 1913:29/30

1843 births
1925 deaths
19th-century Swedish artists
19th-century Swedish businesswomen
19th-century Swedish businesspeople
Swedish designers
19th-century Swedish sculptors
Swedish engravers
19th-century engravers

Members of Nya Idun
Recipients of the Illis quorum